"You Don't Know" is a song by American singer-songwriter Cyndi Lauper, released as the first single from her fifth album, Sisters of Avalon (1997). Remixes of the song were made by several producers such as Tony Moran and Junior Vasquez. It peaked at number 27 in the UK, while peaking at number 16 on the US Billboard Hot Dance Club Play chart. The song contains the word "bullshit" and was not edited out of the UK singles as is typical. While performing on several UK shows, such as Noel's House Party, she skipped the word.

Critical reception
Larry Flick from Billboard wrote, "Lauper unveils her new Sisters Of Avalon collection, offering a tune that is far more biting and intelligent than fluffy past hits like "Girls Just Want To Have Fun" and "She Bop". If programmers can move beyond the singer's old cartoonish image, they will discover an artist and music worthy of placement alongside the likes of Alanis Morissette." He added further, "The original version of "You Don't Know" unfolds with a jittery funk beat and jangly guitars that deserve a listen at modern rock radio. Redrafted by Tony Moran, the song becomes an anthemic disco revelation that popsters will love. Add the underground club perspective of remixers Prince Quick Mix and Junior Vasquez, and you have a single that aims to hit every possible mark. The next step is for people to listen." 

Caroline Sullivan from The Guardian commented in her album review, "And who else could endow the word 'bullshit' with such fervour while denouncing US politics on You Don't Know?" A reviewer from Music Week rated it four out of five, noting that "Lauper's trademark vocal performance is more restrained for this nicely produced, acoustic-style pop song. A certain airplay hit, expect massive sales success, too."

Music video
The accompanying music video for the song was recorded in Washington Square, New York City in the beginning of September 1996. Lauper directed it herself. The little Japanese boy who closes the video is called Grayson. The 6-year-old boy was hand-picked by Lauper.

Track listing

 US CD single
 "You Don't Know" (Radio Edit) – 4:06
 "You Don't Know" (TM's Single Remix) – 4:23
 "That's What I Think" – 4:38

 US CD maxi-single
 "You Don't Know" (Single Mix) - 4:06
 "You Don't Know" (TM's Single Remix) - 4:23
 "You Don't Know" (Junior Vasquez Remix Edit) - 3:34
 "You Don't Know" (TM's Know It All Mix) - 10:06
 "You Don't Know" (Junior Vasquez Remix) - 7:51

 Japanese CD single
 "You Don't Know" (Radio Edit) – 3:59
 "You Don't Know" (Album Version) – 5:14
 "Mother" (Extended Version) – 6:11

 European CD single
 "You Don't Know" (Album Version) - 5:14
 "Mother" (Extended Mix) - 6:12

 UK CD single (The Junior Vasquez Mixes) / European CD maxi-single
 "You Don't Know" (Radio Edit) – 4:06
 "You Don't Know" (Junior Vasquez Remix) – 7:45
 "You Don't Know" (Junior Vasquez Dub) – 6:45
 "Mother" (Extended Mix) – 6:12

 UK Limited Edition CD single
 "You Don't Know" (Album Version) - 5:13
 "Time After Time" - 3:58
 "True Colors" - 3:46
 "I Drove All Night" - 4:11

 Australian CD single
 "You Don't Know" (Radio Edit) - 4:06
 "You Don't Know" (Junior Vasquez Remix) - 7:51
 "You Don't Know" (Tribal Beats) - 4:33
 "Mother" (Extended Mix) - 6:12

 US 12"
A1. "You Don't Know" (TM's Know It All Mix) - 10:00
A2. "You Don't Know" (TM's Know You're in the Hole Dub) - 5:30
B1. "You Don't Know" (Prince Quick Mix's Amped Up Pass) - 6:35
B2. "You Don't Know" (Junior's Riff Dub) - 6:09

 European 12"
A1. "You Don't Know" (Junior Vasquez Remix Edit) - 3:44
A2. "You Don't Know" (Junior Vasquez Remix) - 7:51
A3. "You Don't Know" (Junior Vasquez Dub) - 6:46
B1. "You Don't Know" (Album Version) - 5:14
B2. "You Don't Know" (TM's Single Remix) - 4:23
B3. "You Don't Know" (TM's Know It All Mix) - 10:06
B4. "You Don't Know" (TM's Know You're in the Hole Dub) - 5:33

Official versions
Junior Vasquez Dub – 6:45
Junior Vasquez Remix Edit – 3:34
Junior's Riff Dub – 6:09
Prince Quick Mix's Amped Up Pass – 6:35
Radio edit – 3:59
Tony Moran's Know It All Mix – 10:00
Tony Moran's Know You're in the Hole Dub – 5:30
Tony Moran's Single Remix – 4:23
Tribal Beats – 4:33

Charts

References

Cyndi Lauper songs
1997 singles
Songs written by Cyndi Lauper
Songs written by Jan Pulsford
1996 songs
Epic Records singles
Pop ballads